Jim Lane's Fort, sometimes called Fort Jim Lane, was built in August 1856, in Holton, Kansas, United States. It was named to honor free-state leader James H. Lane, who helped organize the settlement of several towns in northeast Kansas Territory, including Holton. Holton was settled by about fifty free-state settlers at the time the fort was built. The fort, built to serve as a place of refuge for the townspeople, was built of logs.

The settlers of Holton soon heard that a militia partial to the southern element in Kansas was headed their way, so they moved south to Topeka, Kansas, for the winter. Some of the settlers who left returned in December 1856. It is not known to what extent Jim Lane's Fort was used after this point. It possibly stood until 1872, when Central School was built on the site. A bronze marker was placed on the site in 1970, to explain its significance.

References

Forts in Kansas
Buildings and structures in Jackson County, Kansas
1856 establishments in Kansas Territory